Sheltered (Brantley) is a 4-part documentary Canadian television series which premiered on October 20, 2010 on the Aboriginal Peoples Television Network. Co-produced by Mountain Road Productions and Bossy Jossy Productions the series follows Derek Marsden, an Ojibway carpenter, as he travels the world to learn the ancient home building techniques of the world's Indigenous and traditional cultures. His journey takes him to locations in Africa, Central and South America where he lives and work with people who are managing to maintain their customs and lifestyle.

Synopsis
During his visits Derek stays in a structure similar to the one he is working on, spending time with a family and seeing how the shelter functions and shapes the lives of its occupants. He joins them at meals, in games and learns about their culture at the same time that he experiences what it’s like to build a home in a completely different way.

As he learns the construction techniques used to build the home, one of the big things he has to get used to - aside from communicating in a foreign language - is the lack of power tools. Whether he’s mixing mud and straw by hand or hoisting stones with ropes and pulleys, we get to see how he adapts to doing things the way the locals do it. In some cases it’s how they’ve been doing it for thousands of years.

Through his exposure to other Indigenous and traditional cultures he gains insight into how his own people can re-connect to their traditional home building techniques and ultimately their traditional way of life.

Sheltered is an Aboriginal carpenter’s search for the missing links to his past.

Documentary subject bio
Ojibway carpenter Derek Marsden was born and raised on the Alderville First Nations Reserve in south-central Ontario. He learned his carpentry skills working at the side of his grandfather from the time he was a young boy. He has earned a living by building and renovating modern homes for the last ten years. Derek was inspired to go on the Sheltered journey in an attempt to understand how other indigenous cultures have maintained their traditional ways and gain insight into how his own people can reconnect to their past.

Episodes

Awards

|-
| 2011
| Sheltered
| Summit Awards (SCA), Category: Direction - Dave Rheaume - "Episode 4 Women's Work!"
|  Silver
|-

External links 
 http://www.mountainroad.ca/mrp/portfolio/sheltered.php
 http://www.bossyjossy.com/
 http://www.aptn.ca/series/id,54181281
 http://www.facebook.com/shelteredtheseries
 https://web.archive.org/web/20110722053456/http://www.aptn.ca/pages/fullepisodes/

2010 Canadian television series debuts
Aboriginal Peoples Television Network original programming
2010s Canadian documentary television series
First Nations television series